Statistics of Belgian League in season 1990–91.

Overview

18 teams participated, and R.S.C. Anderlecht won the championship, while K. Sint-Truidense V.V. and K. Beerschot V.A.C. were relegated.

League standings

Results

Topscorers

References

Belgian Pro League seasons
Belgian
1990–91 in Belgian football